National Road 5 (abbreviated as EO5) is a single carriageway road in western Greece. It connects Antirrio, at the north end of the Rio-Antirrio bridge, with Ioannina in northwestern Greece, passing through Agrinio and Arta. The southern part, between Amfilochia and Antirrio, is part of the European route E55. The northern part, between Ioannina and Amfilochia, forms the European route E951. It passes on the east side of the Ambracian Gulf. In the future much of the traffic that used this road will be diverted to the new A5 (Ionia Odos) motorway, which has already taken over parts of the road. Νear Arta there is a 200m. tunnel (Kleisoura tunnel) which opened in 1969

Route
The GR-5 passes through the following towns and cities, ordered from south to north:

Antirrio (bypass, junction with GR-48)
Missolonghi (bypass)
east of Aitoliko
Agrinio (junction with GR-38)
Amfilochia (junction with GR-42)
Menidi
Arta (bypass, junction with GR-21
Filippiada
Ioannina

References 

5
Roads in Epirus (region)
Roads in Western Greece